Excellent Sheep: The Miseducation of the American Elite and the Way to a Meaningful Life is a 2015 book of social criticism on the role of elite colleges in American society written by William Deresiewicz and published by Free Press. Deresiewicz addresses the pressure of succeeding under which students are put by their parents and by society, considering more particularly the ones that are planning to attend Ivy League universities.

Notes

References

External links 

 

2015 non-fiction books
Books about education
Free Press (publisher) books
Books about the philosophy of education
Books about the sociology of education
Books about higher education
English-language books
American non-fiction books
Elite theory